1845 in philosophy

Events

Publications 
 Alexander von Humboldt, Cosmos: A Sketch of the Physical Description of the Universe (1845)
 William Whewell, The Elements Of Morality, Including Polity (1845)
 Domingo Faustino Sarmiento, Facundo (1845)
 Søren Kierkegaard, Stages on Life's Way (1845)

Births 
 March 3 - Georg Cantor (died 1918)

Deaths 
 May 12 - August Wilhelm Schlegel (born 1767)
 February 22 - Sydney Smith (born 1771)

External links

References 

Philosophy
19th-century philosophy
Philosophy by year